Grant Mossop (1948 - 7 October 2005) was a geologist from Canada. He earned a B.Sc. in 1970 and an M.Sc. in 1971 from the University of Calgary followed by a Ph.D. in geology from the University of London. He served as the Director of the Institute of Sedimentary and Petroleum Geology, Geological Survey of Canada Calgary. A graduate scholarship in his name was established in 2009.

He was awarded the Ambrose Medal of the Geological Association of Canada in 1995.

References

1948 births
2005 deaths
20th-century Canadian geologists
Geological Survey of Canada personnel
University of Calgary alumni
Alumni of the University of London